Jonathan Gleich (born October 19, 1958) is a Segway activist who has fought traffic tickets issued as a result of his use of the Segway in his commute to New York City.

Life experiences

Weight loss

Gleich lost over 250 lbs after having Lap band surgery. Gleich is writing a book about his weight loss experience, with a working title of Chronic Masticator.

Technology experience

Gleich was one of the first Segway enthusiasts in the New York area, logging more than 10,000 miles. Using his Segway to commute to work every day has landed him several moving violations, followed by subsequent appearances in court to defend them.

In 1979, using an Apple II Plus computer, Gleich co-founded an NYC BBS called Earth News. He expanded it to be the first multi-user (3 user) system running on a Corvus. In 1985, he started ENetwork using a Galacticomm system that supported 16 users simultaneously, and had over 700 active members.

Current projects

Gleich won first prize in the Motorized Float division at the 2009 Coney Island Mermaid Parade appearing as Zoltar (from the film Big) on his Segway. In 2008 he won third place as a "Segway Pirate."

Gleich has been a contributing writer to the website Instructables.com (www.instructables.com). He was featured:
 On The Rachael Ray show for his "pool noodle beverage barge" instructable. 
 In Engadget for his  Electrlouminecent bumper sticker.
 A featured contributor for his alexa controlled toilet.

References

External links 
 Jonathan Gleich's Homepage

1958 births
Living people
Activists from New York City
Health and wellness writers